John Anthony Moses (born 10 June 1930 in Atherton, Queensland) is an Australian historian, history educator and Anglican priest. He is known for his work on modern German history, the history of trade unionism and the history of colonialism.

He earned his B.A. at the University of Queensland in 1959, his M.A. at the University Queensland in 1963 and his PhD at the University of Erlangen in Germany in 1965. He taught at the University of Queensland from 1965 to 1994, as a lecturer, senior lecturer (from 1970), and reader (from 1975). He was head of the history department from 1986. He also became a priest in the Anglican Church of Australia in 1978. He has been a professorial associate at St Mark's National Theological Centre in Canberra since 2007.

He is married to Professor Ingrid Moses, former Chancellor of the University of Canberra. They are the parents of the noted historian Dirk Moses.

Selected works
The Politics of Illusion: The Fischer Controversy in German Historiography, Barnes & Noble, 1975
Germany in the Pacific and Far East, 1870–1914, ed. with Paul Kennedy, University of Queensland Press, 1977
Historical Disciplines and Culture in Australia, ed., University of Queensland Press, 1979
Trade Unionism in Germany from Bismarck to Hitler: 1869–1918, George Prior Publishers, 1982
Trade Unionism in Germany from Bismarck to Hitler: 1919–1933, George Prior Publishers, 1982
Trade Union Theory from Marx to Walesa, Berg, 1990
The German Empire and Britain's Pacific Dominions 1871–1919, ed. with Christopher Pugsley, Regina Books, 2000
The Reluctant Revolutionary: Dietrich Bonhoeffer's Collision with Prusso-German History, Berghahn Books, 2009

References

Australian historians
Academic staff of the University of Queensland
1930 births
Living people